Raúl Damiani (born April 29, 1979, in Roldán, Santa Fe, Argentina) is an Argentine football defender currently playing for Instituto of the Primera B Nacional in Argentina. He played as a right back.

Teams
  Newell's Old Boys 1997–2002
  Independiente 2002–2003
  Libertad 2004–2007
  San Martín de San Juan 2008–2010
  Instituto 2010–present

References
 
 

1979 births
Living people
People from San Lorenzo Department
Argentine footballers
Argentine expatriate footballers
Club Atlético Independiente footballers
San Martín de San Juan footballers
Newell's Old Boys footballers
Instituto footballers
Club Libertad footballers
Expatriate footballers in Paraguay
Association football defenders
Sportspeople from Santa Fe Province